Udayaratna was a Jain monk and one of the leading Gujarati poets of 17th-18th century. He was a disciple of Shivaratna of Tapa Gaccha of Svetambara Jainism.

Works
He had written large number of Rasas. Jambuswami Rasa (1693), Sthubhadra Rasa (1703), Navkara Rasa (1706), Malaysundara Rasa (1710), Yashodahara Rasa (1711), Lilavati Sumativilasa Rasa (1711), Bhuvanbhanu Kevalino Rasa (1713), Harivansha Rasa (1743) are some of them. He had also written large number of short poetry in the forms of Stavana, Sajjhaya and Sholaka. His Stavana of Shankheshwar Parshwanath and his Sajjhaya on four Kashayas (anger, pride, deceit and greed) are still sung by Jains.

References

Date of birth missing
Date of death missing
Indian male poets
Gujarati-language poets
Indian Jain poets
Indian Jain monks
17th-century Indian Jains
17th-century Jain monks
17th-century Indian monks
17th-century Indian poets
18th-century Indian Jains
18th-century Jain monks
18th-century Indian monks
18th-century Indian poets
18th-century male writers
17th-century male writers